Joseph J. Lawler (born January 12, 1901) was an American football and basketball coach and assistant postmaster general of the United States Postal Service.

He served as the head football and basketball coach at Mount Saint Mary's University in Emmitsburg, Maryland during the 1935-36 and 1936-37 seasons. After leaving coaching, he served in a number of roles in the USPS.

References

1901 births
Year of death missing
Basketball coaches from Pennsylvania
Basketball players from Pennsylvania
Catholic University Cardinals football players
Catholic University Cardinals men's basketball players
Columbus School of Law alumni
High school football coaches in Pennsylvania
Mount St. Mary's Mountaineers football coaches
Mount St. Mary's Mountaineers men's basketball coaches
People from Lackawanna County, Pennsylvania
Players of American football from Pennsylvania
University of Scranton alumni